Orthocomotis lactistrigata is a species of moth of the family Tortricidae. It is found in Carchi Province, Ecuador.

The wingspan is 15 mm. The ground colour of the forewings is whitish, but paler along the costa and snow white beneath the apex. The remaining area is suffused with grey-brown and dark brown. The hindwings are dark greyish brown.

Etymology
The species name refers to the small whitish streak near the end of the median cell of the forewing and is derived from Latin lac (meaning milk) and strigatus (meaning with streaks).

References

Moths described in 2007
Orthocomotis